{{Infobox building
| name                 = Babelsberg Palace
| native_name          = Schloss Babelsberg
| former_names         =
| alternate_names      = 
| image                = Schloss Babelsberg 3.jpg
| alt                  = 
| caption              = Babelsberg Palace
| map_type             = Germany Berlin
| map_alt              = 
| map_caption          = Location in Berlin
| altitude             = 
| building_type        = Palace
| architectural_style  = Gothic revival 
| structural_system    = 
| cost                 =  
| client               = Prince (later Emperor)  William I
| owner                = Stiftung Preußische Schlösser und Gärten Berlin-Brandenburg
| current_tenants      = 
| landlord             = 
| location             = 
| address              = 
| location_town        = Potsdam
| location_country     = Germany
| coordinates          = 
| start_date           = 1833
| completion_date      = 1849
| inauguration_date    = 
| renovation_date      = 
| height               = 
| floor_count          = 
| floor_area           = 
| main_contractor      = 
| architect            = Karl Friedrich Schinkel Ludwig Persius Johann Heinrich Strack
| architecture_firm    =
| structural_engineer  = 
| services_engineer    = 
| civil_engineer       = 
| awards               =
| website =  [http://www.spsg.de Stiftung Preußische Schlösser und Gärten]
| references           =
| footnotes = 
}}
Babelsberg Palace lies in the eponymous park and quarter of Potsdam, the capital of the German state of Brandenburg, near Berlin. For over 50 years it was the summer residence of Prince William, later German Emperor William I and King of Prussia and his wife, Augusta of the House of Saxe-Weimar-Eisenach, German Empress and Queen of Prussia. Along with the surrounding park and other parks in the area, the Babelsberg Palace was inscribed on the UNESCO World Heritage list in 1990 for its architectural cohesion and its testimony to the power of the Prussian monarchy.

History
The building, designed in the English Gothic revival style, was built in two phases over the period 1833–1849. The contract to plan the palace was given to the architects Karl Friedrich Schinkel, who was in charge of the works until his death, in 1841, Ludwig Persius and Johann Heinrich Strack.

On 22 September 1862 in the palace and adjoining park the discussion between King William I of Prussia and Otto von Bismarck took place that ended with the nomination of Bismarck as Minister President and Foreign Minister of Prussia.

The architecture of Babelsberg Palace formed the template for the construction of Kittendorf Palace between 1848 and 1853 in Mecklenburg-Vorpommern, by Schinkel's pupil, Friedrich Hitzig.

World Heritage Site
Since 1990, Babelsberg Palace has been part of the UNESCO World Heritage Site "Palaces and Parks of Potsdam and Berlin". The palace is administered by the Stiftung Preußische Schlösser und Gärten Berlin-Brandenburg.
 
Since 2013, the palace has been undergoing an intense renovation of its facades and interiors.

Gallery

See also
 List of castles in Berlin and Brandenburg
 Palaces and Parks of Potsdam and Berlin

References

 Amtlicher Führer der Stiftung Preußische Schlösser und Gärten Berlin-Brandenburg: Park und Schloss Babelsberg. 3rd edition, 1999
 Gert Streidt, Klaus Frahm: Potsdam. Die Schlösser und Gärten der Hohenzollern.  Könemann Verlagsgesellschaft mbH. Cologne, 1996.  
 Georg Poensgen: Schloss Babelsberg''. Deutscher Kunstverlag, Berlin 1929.

External links

 Babelsberg Palace on the website Stiftung Preußische Schlösser und Gärten

Houses completed in 1849
World Heritage Sites in Germany
Babelsberg
Potsdam Babelsberg
Buildings and structures in Potsdam
Tourist attractions in Potsdam
1849 establishments in Prussia
Museums in Potsdam
Historic house museums in Germany
Royal residences in Brandenburg
Karl Friedrich Schinkel buildings
William I, German Emperor